Tetraethylene glycol dimethyl ether (TEGDME or tetraglyme) is a polar aprotic solvent with excellent chemical and thermal stability. Its high boiling point and stability makes it an ideal candidate for separation processes and high temperature reactions. TEGDME is also used in lithium-ion battery technology and combined with trifluoroethanol as a working pair for organic absorption heat pumps.

TEGDME is listed as a Substance of Very High Concern under REACH regulations.

References

External links
 Santa-Cruz Biotechnology MSDS
 Sigma Aldrich MSDS, including an explicit warning related to reproductive health not present in the Santa-Cruz Biotechnology MSDS

Glycol ethers